A pumpkin queen may be either a fictional character or a real person associated with a variety of beauty contests held in North America.

Pumpkin festivals in various American states include pageants to determine their pumpkin queen.

Major festivals and shows 

The Circleville Pumpkin Show, the oldest pumpkin show with a Miss Pumpkin Show contest, has been held annually since 1903 (except 1917, during World War II & 2020). 

Other notable pumpkin shows and festivals featuring contests in which winners can become pumpkin queens include: 
 Confluence PumpkinFest (2003–2006), 
 Danbury Pumpkin Harvest (1966), 

Huntsburg Pumpkin Festival, 2006: Huntsburg Pumpkin Festival Queens  

The Barnesville Pumpkin Festival (1964–2006), 

The Bradford Pumpkin Show (-2006), 

 The Halloween Pumpkin Princess Tea and Pageant (1965–2007), 

 The Spring Hope National Pumpkin Festival (1971–2006), 

 The Versailles Pumpkin Show (1902–2005), 

 The West Virginia Pumpkin Festival (1985–2006), 

 Tioga Pumpkin Festival (2006).

References 

Beauty pageants in the United States
Pumpkin festivals
Halloween in the United States